Peridrome subfascia is a species of moth in the family Erebidae first described by Francis Walker in 1854. The species is found in Bangladesh, India, Malaysia, Myanmar, Thailand and Vietnam.

The wingspan is 64–67 mm.

References

Aganainae
Moths of Asia